Daniel Mulcahy (7 January 1882 – 13 July 1953) was an Australian politician. Born in Milltown, Ireland, he was educated at Irish Catholic schools and migrated to Australia as a youth. He became a publican in Sydney and served on both Waterloo Council, including several terms as mayor, and Sydney City Council. In 1934, he was elected to the Australian House of Representatives as the member for Lang, representing the Langite Australian Labor Party (NSW). Mulcahy joined the federal Labor Party when the two parties merged in 1936, but left the ALP for the Australian Labor Party (Non-Communist), another Lang party, in 1940. When this second split was resolved, Mulcahy again joined the federal ALP. He held his seat until his death in Vaucluse in 1953.

References

1882 births
1953 deaths
Australian Labor Party members of the Parliament of Australia
Lang Labor members of the Parliament of Australia
Members of the Australian House of Representatives for Lang
Members of the Australian House of Representatives
Irish emigrants to Australia
Mayors of Waterloo
20th-century Australian politicians